Sir Charles Ashley Rupert Walker  (born 11 September 1967) is a British politician who served as chair of the House of Commons Procedure Committee from 2012 to 2019. A member of the Conservative Party, he has been Member of Parliament (MP) for Broxbourne in Hertfordshire since 2005.

Early life and career
Born in Henley-on-Thames in September 1967, Walker was educated at The American School in London, followed by the University of Oregon in the United States, receiving a BSc in Political Science in 1990.

Walker pursued a career in marketing and communications and held senior positions within a number of businesses. He was on the board of directors of Blue Arrow. He belonged to the trade union Amicus. Walker was a member of Wandsworth Council from 2002 to 2006. He had previously stood unsuccessfully in Ealing North at the 2001 general election.

Parliamentary career

Early parliamentary career: 2005–2012 
At the 2005 general election, Walker was elected as Member of Parliament for Broxbourne. Upon election, he sat on the Scottish Select Committee from 2005 to 2010 and was also a member of the Public Administration Select Committee from 2007 to 2010.

Walker was one of the 23 MPs to sign the motion of no confidence in Speaker Michael Martin.

In 2011, Walker made what is believed by some to be the shortest Parliamentary speech in history, when he made a four-word contribution in a European Union debate on membership: "If not now, when?" (referring to the option of a referendum on the issue)

He joined the Panel of Chairs in 2010 and was co-chair of the Education Bill that went through committee in 2011. In May 2010, he was elected vice-chairman of the 1922 Committee and in the same year was elected to the Conservative Party Board.

House of Commons Procedure Committee: 2012–2019 
In October 2012, Walker was elected as chair of the Procedure Committee, which decides on the process for election of a new Speaker of the House of Commons.  In addition to his chairing duties, Walker is a member of the Speaker's Committee for the Independent Parliamentary Standards Authority (SCIPSA) and answers parliamentary questions on behalf of the committee.

In July 2013, Walker voted in favour of extending same-sex marriage to England and Wales.

In December 2013, Walker was the only MP to confirm he would accept an 11% pay increase. His championship of the pay rise and membership of the committee led to him being described by The Daily Telegraph as being in with an outside chance of becoming speaker when John Bercow stood down.

In the last parliamentary session before the 2015 general election, Walker explained what he knew about the Government decision to force a vote on changing the rules for electing a speaker for the next Parliament, in order to remove the then-Speaker John Bercow.

Walker said he had written a report on the subject "years ago" but although he had talked to William Hague and Michael Gove that week, neither had told him their objectives. He had only found out via the grapevine, and stated that he would rather be "an honourable fool" than part of a plot. The government lost the vote and Walker received a standing ovation.

Following the 2015 general election, Walker was returned unopposed as chair of the Procedure Committee.

Walker was appointed an Officer of the Order of the British Empire (OBE) in the 2015 New Year Honours for political service, and was appointed a Knight Commander of the Order of the British Empire (KBE) in Theresa May's resignation honours on 10 September 2019, "for political and public service".

In May 2019, Walker and Cheryl Gillan became acting chairs of the 1922 Committee after Graham Brady resigned to consider standing in the leadership contest to succeed Theresa May as Conservative leader. They stood down when Brady returned to the role in September of that year.

Criticisms of COVID-19 lockdown restrictions: 2020–2021 
In response to the Johnson government's attempt to control COVID-19 through a three tier system, Walker said in October 2020 that the government seemed to think it could "abolish death". He also accused the government's Scientific Advisory Group for Emergencies of choosing to "ramp up" the "fear factor" regarding the disease. Regarding the second tier regulations in November, Walker said "As we drift further into an authoritarian coercive state, the only legal mechanism left open to me is to vote against that legislation. The people of this country will never, ever forgive the political class for criminalising parents seeing children."

In November 2020, Walker called police officers a "disgrace" for enforcing government laws surrounding COVID-19 by arresting a 72-year-old woman who was "peacefully protesting" and who was charged under the Coronavirus Act. At the time, Walker called for the Constitution of the United Kingdom to be codified into a single written document (it is currently uncodified) to prevent further curbs on civil liberties.

On 25 March 2021, following a debate on the six-month extension of emergency powers during the COVID-19 lockdown, Walker made a widely reported speech in which he said:

The speech was described as "surreal" by The Guardian, "bizarre" by The Independent, "astonishing" by Yahoo, and "odd" by indy100.

On 18 April 2021, Walker published an op-ed in The Daily Telegraph in which he stated his concern about the rumoured COVID vaccine passports, specifically by drawing parallels to other public health concerns not managed in the same way, such as obesity.

Retirement from the House of Commons: 2022–present 
On 1 February 2022, Walker announced he would be standing down at the next general election, saying there had been "a lot of grief and pain" in the country which had meant politics had become a "pretty toxic environment".

Walker endorsed Penny Mordaunt during the July 2022 Conservative Party leadership election. He became the fifth Conservative MP to publicly call for the Prime Minister Liz Truss to resign. During the government crisis on 19 October 2022, Walker called the Truss ministry "a shambles and a disgrace... utterly appalling", commenting of its supporters that he had "had enough of talentless people" for whom "it’s in their own personal interest to achieve a ministerial position".

Recognition
In 2012, in a debate in Parliament on mental health issues and their "taboo", Walker spoke about his 30-year experience of obsessive–compulsive disorder, alongside the Labour MP Kevan Jones, who spoke about his own experience of having depression. Walker and Jones were both later praised for their speeches by Time to Change, a mental health anti-stigma campaign run by charities Mind and Rethink Mental Illness.

Walker has twice won The Spectator Speech of the Year at its annual Parliamentarian of the Year Awards: the first time in 2011 and the second time in 2012 when he shared the award with Kevan Jones. He was also one of The Spectators Parliamentarians of the Year in 2013. In 2012, he was chosen as one of the Telegraphs "50 Great Britons" for that year and was also one of The Guardians "Stories of 2012". He was awarded the President's Medal by the Royal College of Psychiatrists in November 2013.

Personal life
Walker is the stepson of middle-distance runner and former Conservative MP Sir Christopher Chataway. He is married and has three children.

Electoral history

References

External links

Official website

 BBC profile  at Democracy Live
 Official channel at YouTube

1967 births
Conservative Party (UK) MPs for English constituencies
Councillors in the London Borough of Wandsworth
Living people
Knights Commander of the Order of the British Empire
People with obsessive–compulsive disorder
Politicians awarded knighthoods
UK MPs 2005–2010
UK MPs 2010–2015
UK MPs 2015–2017
UK MPs 2017–2019
UK MPs 2019–present
University of Oregon alumni